Gibson Marine Provincial Park is a provincial park in British Columbia, Canada, located on the southeast end of Flores Island in the central Clayoquot Sound region of Vancouver Island. The park was created on 13 November 1967.

See also
Hot Springs Cove, British Columbia
Marktosis, British Columbia
Maquinna Marine Provincial Park
Sydney Inlet Provincial Park
Sulphur Passage Provincial Park

References

 http://www.bclaws.ca/civix/document/id/lc/billsprevious/36th3rd:gov86-1#18

Clayoquot Sound region
Provincial parks of British Columbia
1967 establishments in British Columbia
Protected areas established in 1967
Marine parks of Canada